Herschel Jerome Jantjies (born 22 April 1996) is a South African professional rugby union player for the South Africa national team and the  in Super Rugby. His regular position is scrum-half.

Rugby career

Jantjies was born in Stellenbosch, where he attended Paul Roos Gymnasium. He represented  at Under-16 level in 2012 and at the Craven Week tournaments in 2013 in 2014.

He made four appearances as a replacement for Western Province in the 2017 Rugby Challenge, a competition they would go on to win, before reverting to the  team for the latter half of the season.

Schoolboy rugby kicked off at his hometown of Kylemore where he attended P.C Petersen Primary from where he graduated to his high schooling career which initially started at Kylemore High School where his excellence was spotted. His constant game-changing performances got the interest from Paul Roos Gymnasium in Stellenbosch, where he started playing under 14 rugby for the D team. His size counted against him, but once he got game time, he grabbed the opportunity with both hands. At the tender age of 14, he undertook his first trip overseas where he represented a South African invitational side on a postseason rugby tour to Scotland in the UK. Jantjies' rugby master brain scored his constant features at WP Grant Komo and Craven week and constant 1st team starts for Paul Roos in the South African Premiere Schools league.

International rugby

In their next match against  in Wellington, Jantjies scored his side's only try in the 79th minute to help them to a 16–16 draw for a total of 3 tries in his first 2 games.

Jantjies was named in South Africa's squad for the 2019 Rugby World Cup. South Africa went on to win the tournament, defeating England in the final.

References

External links
 
 

South African rugby union players
Living people
1996 births
People from Stellenbosch
Rugby union scrum-halves
Stormers players
Western Province (rugby union) players
Alumni of Paul Roos Gymnasium
Cape Coloureds
South Africa international rugby union players
Scarlets players
Rugby union players from the Western Cape